The lieutenant governor of South Carolina is the second-in-command to the governor of South Carolina.  Beyond overseeing the Office on Aging and the responsibility to act or serve as governor in the event of the office's vacancy, the duties of the lieutenant governor are chiefly ceremonial. The current lieutenant governor is Pamela Evette, who took office January 9, 2019.

Roles and responsibilities
The chief responsibility of the lieutenant governor is to act as governor in the case that the governor is temporarily unable to fulfill his or her duties. And if the governor is no longer able to serve as governor, the lieutenant governor ascends to the office of governor. Since 1776, eleven lieutenant governors have ascended to the governorship, the most recent of which was on January 24, 2017, when incumbent Governor Nikki Haley resigned to become the United States Ambassador to the United Nations; Lieutenant Governor Henry McMaster immediately became governor.

From 1865 until 2019, the lieutenant governor served as the president of the South Carolina Senate. However, constitutional amendments that took effect in January 2019 require that the Senate choose its own president from among its body. The office of lieutenant governor is considered a part-time position and has no constitutional responsibilities outside of exercising the powers of the governor when necessary. The office of lieutenant governor oversees the South Carolina Office on Aging.

Election and term
The lieutenant governor is elected at the same time and on the same ticket as the governor. The lieutenant governor's term is the same as the governor's, beginning at noon on the first Wednesday after the second Tuesday of January following the election and lasting four years. Unlike the governor, there are no term limits for lieutenant governor, though no lieutenant governor under the current constitution has ever served more than two terms or 8 years. The lieutenant governor must also meet the eligibility requirement as the office of governor.

Oath of office
The lieutenant governor-elect is constitutionally required to take an oath of office before fulfilling any duties of the office:

"I do solemnly swear (or affirm) that I am duly qualified, according to the Constitution of this State, to exercise the duties of the office to which I have been elected, (or appointed), and that I will, to the best of my ability, discharge the duties thereof, and preserve, protect, and defend the Constitution of this State and of the United States. So help me God."

Succession
Should the lieutenant governor leave the office early by impeachment conviction, death, resignation, disability, or disqualification, the governor will appoint a new lieutenant governor. If both the governor and lieutenant governor are unable to become governor, then the Speaker of the South Carolina House of Representatives, President of the South Carolina Senate, Secretary of State, State Treasurer or Attorney General (in that order) shall become governor.

Compensation
As a part-time position, the lieutenant governor receives a salary of $46,545, the lowest salary of any elected statewide office in South Carolina.

List of lieutenant governors

See also
Governor of South Carolina
South Carolina Senate
South Carolina General Assembly

References

Lieutenant Governors of South Carolina